Bessarion (2 January 1403 – 18 November 1472) was a Byzantine Greek Renaissance humanist, theologian, Catholic cardinal and one of the famed Greek scholars who contributed to the so-called great revival of letters in the 15th century. 

He was educated by Gemistus Pletho in Neoplatonic philosophy and later served as the titular Latin Patriarch of Constantinople. He eventually was named a cardinal and was twice considered for the papacy.

His baptismal name was Basil (Greek: Βασίλειος, Basileios or Basilios). The name Bessarion he took when entering the monastery. He has been mistakenly known also as Johannes Bessarion due to an erroneous interpretation of Gregory III Mammas.

Biography

Bessarion was born in Trebizond, the Black Sea port in northeastern Anatolia that was the heart of Pontic Greek culture and civilization during the Byzantine and Ottoman periods. The year of his birth has been given as 1389, 1395 or 1403.

Bessarion's Neoplatonism
Bessarion was educated in Constantinople, then went in 1423 to Mystras, Peloponnese to study Neoplatonism under Gemistus Pletho. Under Pletho, he "went through the liberal arts curriculum…, with a special emphasis on mathematics…including the study of astronomy and geography" that would have related "philosophy to physics…cosmology and astrology" and Pletho's "mathematics would include Pythagorean number-mysticism, Plato’s cosmological geometry and the Neoplatonic arithmetic which connected the material world with the world of Plato’s Forms. Possibly it also included astrology…" Woodhouse also mentions that Bessarion "had a mystical streak…[and] was proficient in Neoplatonic vocabulary…mathematics…and Platonic theology".

Bessarion's Neoplatonism stayed with him his whole life, even as a cardinal. He was very familiar with Neoplatonist terminology and used it in his letter to Pletho's two sons, Demitrios and Andronikos, on the death of his still-beloved teacher in 1452. Perhaps the most remarkable thing about his life was that a Neoplatonist could have played such a significant role in the Catholic Church for at least a brief time, though he was attacked for his views by more orthodox Catholic academics shortly after his death.

Role in the Council of Ferrara
On becoming a tonsured monk, he adopted the name of an old Egyptian anchorite Bessarion, whose story he has related. In 1436 became abbot of a monastery in Constantinople and in 1437, he was made metropolitan of Nicaea by the Byzantine Emperor John VIII Palaeologus, whom he accompanied to Italy in order to bring about a reunion between the Eastern (Orthodox) and Western (Catholic) churches. The emperor hoped to use the possibility of re-uniting the churches to obtain help from Western Europe against the Ottoman Empire. Bessarion participated in the Byzantine delegation to the Council of Ferrara-Florence as the most eminent representative of unionists, although he originally belonged to the party of anti-unionists. On 6 July 1439, he read the declaration of the Greek Association of Churches in the cathedral of Florence, in the presence of Pope Eugene IV and the Emperor John VIII Palaeologus.

Some historians have impugned Bessarion's sincerity in adhering to the union. However, Gill upholds Bessarion's sincerity in being convinced to the truth of the Roman position in the matters discussed at the Council quoting from the bishop's own Oratio Dogmatica:

Upon his return to the East, he found himself bitterly resented for his attachment to the minority party that saw no difficulty in a reconciliation of the two churches. Pope Eugene IV invested him with the rank of cardinal at a consistory of 18 December 1439.

From that time, Bessarion resided permanently in Italy, doing much (by his patronage of learned men, by his collection of books and manuscripts, and by his own writings) to spread abroad the New Learning. His palazzo in Rome was a virtual academy for the studies of new humanistic learning, a center for learned Greeks and Greek refugees, whom he supported by commissioning transcripts of Greek manuscripts and translations into Latin that made Greek scholarship available to Western Europeans. He supported Regiomontanus in this fashion and defended Nicholas of Cusa. He is known in history as the original patron of the Greek exiles (scholars and diplomats) including Theodore Gaza, George of Trebizond, John Argyropoulos, and Janus Lascaris.

He held in succession the archbishopric of Siponto and the suburbicarian sees of Sabina and Frascati. At the papal conclave of 1455 which elected the Aragonese candidate, Alfons de Borja, as Callixtus III, Cardinal Bessarion was an early candidate for his disinterest in the competition between Roman factions that pressed candidates of the Orsini and Colonna factions. He was opposed for his Greek background by the French Cardinal Alain de Coëtivy.

For five years (1450–1455), he was legate at Bologna, and he was engaged on embassies to many foreign princes, among others to Louis XI of France in 1471.  Other missions were to Germany to encourage Western princes to help their fellow Christians in the East.  For these efforts, his fellow humanist Aeneas Silvius Piccolomini, then Pius II, gave him the purely ceremonial title of Latin Patriarch of Constantinople in 1463.

As primus Cardinalium (from April 1463) – the title Dean of the Sacred College of Cardinals was not yet in use – Cardinal Bessarion presided over the Papal conclave, 1464 and Papal conclave, 1471.

He died on 18 November 1472 at Ravenna. He is buried in the basilica of Santi Apostoli, Rome.

Works

Bessarion was one of the most learned scholars of his time. Besides his translations of Aristotle's Metaphysics and Xenophon's Memorabilia, his most important work is a treatise directed against George of Trebizond, a vehement Aristotelian who had written a polemic against Plato, which was entitled In Calumniatorem Platonis ("Against the Slanderer of Plato"). Bessarion, though a Platonist, was not so thoroughgoing in his admiration as Gemistus Pletho, and he strove instead to reconcile the two philosophies. His work, by opening up the relations of Platonism to the main questions of religion, contributed greatly to the extension of speculative thought in the department of theology.

It was thanks to him that the Bibliotheca, an important compendium of Greek mythology, has survived to the present.

His library, which contained a very extensive collection of Greek manuscripts, was presented by him in 1468 to the Senate of the Republic of Venice, and forms the nucleus of the famous library of St Mark's, the Biblioteca Marciana. It comprised 482 Greek and 264 Latin manuscripts.

Most of Bessarion's works are in Migne, Patrologia Graeca, vol. 161.

See also
 Greek scholars in the Renaissance
 John Chortasmenos

References

Attribution

Sources
  (not fully exploited)
 Francis A. Burkle-Young, "The election of Pope Calixtus III (1455)" Bessarion an early candidate, opposed by the French.
 Geanakoplos, Deno John. Greek Scholars in Venice: Studies in the Dissemination of Greek Learning from Byzantium to the West (Cambridge, Massachusetts : Harvard, 1962).
 Gill, Joseph. The Council of Florence (Cambridge, UK : Cambridge University Press, 1959).
 Harris, Jonathan. Greek Emigres in the West (Camberley : Porphyrogenitus, 1995).
 Henderson, Duane. "Bessarion, Cardinalis Nicenus. A cardinalitial vita between ideal conceptions and institutional structures," , 79-122.
 Keller, A. "A Byzantine admirer of 'western' progress: Cardinal Bessarion", in, Cambridge Historical Journal, 11 (1953[-]5), 343–8.
 
 Labowsky, Carlota. Bessarion's Library and the Biblioteca Marciana (Rome : Edizioni di storia e letteratura, 1979).
 Legrand, Émile. Bibliographie Hellenique (Paris : E. Leroux (E. Guilmoto), 1885–1906). volume 1.
 
 Mohler, Ludwig Kardinal Bessarion als Theologe, Humanist und Staatsmann (Aalen : Scientia Verlag ; Paderborn : F. Schöningh, 1923–42), 3 volumes.
 Monfasani, John. Byzantine Scholars in Renaissance Italy: Cardinal Bessarion and other Émigrés (Aldershot, UK : Variorum, 1995).
 Setton, K.M. "The Byzantine background to the Italian Renaissance", in, Proceedings of the American Philosophical Society, 100 (1956), 1–76.
 Vast, Henri. Le Cardinal Bessarion (Paris : Hachette, 1878), see also (Geneva : Slatkine, 1977).
 Wilson, Nigel Guy. From Byzantium to Italy. Greek Studies in the Italian Renaissance (London : Duckworth, 1992).

External links
 
 
 
 
 Makripoulias Christos, "Bessarion Cardinal", Encyclopaedia of the Hellenic World, Asia Minor
 

1403 births
1472 deaths
15th-century Greek people
Byzantine Pontians
Cardinal-bishops of Frascati
Cardinal-bishops of Sabina
Converts to Roman Catholicism from Eastern Orthodoxy
Deans of the College of Cardinals
Diplomats of the Holy See
East–West Schism
Empire of Trebizond
Former Greek Orthodox Christians
Greek cardinals
Greek Renaissance humanists
Greek theologians
Latin Patriarchs of Constantinople
People from Trapezus
Bishops of Nicaea
15th-century Byzantine writers
15th-century philosophers
15th-century Greek scientists
15th-century Greek educators
15th-century Greek philosophers
15th-century Greek mathematicians
15th-century Greek astronomers